Alexia Portal is a French actress best known for her role as Béatrice Romand's son's girlfriend in the 1998 film Autumn Tale.

Filmography
"Navarro"
Jour de colère (2006) TV Episode .... Sonya
Manipulation (2005) TV Episode .... Sophie
Si j'étais elle (2004) (TV) .... Léa
Tout pour l'oseille (2004) .... Marion
"Cordier, juge et flic, Les"
Liens de sang (2004) TV Episode .... Sophie Lestrade
Compagnon, Le (2003) (TV) .... Betty Tardieu
"Avocats & associés"
Secrets de campagne (2003) TV Episode .... Clarisse
Pont de l'aigle, Le (2002) (TV) .... Mathilde Coudert
Monsieur Batignole (2002) .... Micheline Batignole
Compagnon - choisir son père, Le (2002) (TV) .... Betty Tardieu
Maigret et la croqueuse de diamants (2001) (TV) .... Gloria
Un jeune Français (2000) (TV) .... Laure
"Un homme en colère"
La peur de l'autre (2000) TV Episode .... Marine
"Mai con i quadri" (1999) (mini) TV Series
Temps d'un éclair, Le (1998) (TV) .... Jennifer
Conte d'automne (1998) .... Rosine
aka Autumn Tale (USA)
Bonnes vacances (1998) (TV) .... Justine
Quand un ange passe (1998) (TV) .... Martine 68
"Madame le proviseur"
aka Madame la proviseur (France: new title)
Bob et Samantha (1996) TV Episode .... Samantha

External links
 

Year of birth missing (living people)
Living people
French film actresses
French television actresses